Samuel Igun (born 28 February 1938 in Warri, Delta State) is a retired Olympic athlete from Nigeria. He specialised in the triple jump, high jump and long jump events during his career.

Igun represented Nigeria at four consecutive Olympic Games, starting in 1960. He claimed the gold medal in the men's triple jump event at the 1966 British Empire and Commonwealth Games for his native African country.

External links
 sports-reference

1938 births
Living people
Nigerian male long jumpers
Nigerian male triple jumpers
Nigerian male high jumpers
Olympic athletes of Nigeria
Athletes (track and field) at the 1960 Summer Olympics
Athletes (track and field) at the 1964 Summer Olympics
Athletes (track and field) at the 1968 Summer Olympics
Athletes (track and field) at the 1972 Summer Olympics
Athletes (track and field) at the 1966 British Empire and Commonwealth Games
Athletes (track and field) at the 1970 British Commonwealth Games
Commonwealth Games gold medallists for Nigeria
Commonwealth Games silver medallists for Nigeria
Sportspeople from Warri
Commonwealth Games medallists in athletics
African Games gold medalists for Nigeria
African Games medalists in athletics (track and field)
Athletes (track and field) at the 1965 All-Africa Games
20th-century Nigerian people
Medallists at the 1966 British Empire and Commonwealth Games